Moore is a rural town and locality in the Somerset Region, Queensland, Australia.

Geography
Moore is situated at the base of the Balfour Range between Esk in the Brisbane River valley and Yarraman in the South Burnett. The Brisbane River passes through the locality from north to south passing to the east of the town centre. The D'Aguilar Highway runs from the south to the north-west of the locality. The western end of the locality is within the Benarkin State Forest.

Moore contains the following mountains and mountain passes (from north to south):

 Marion Hill 
 Mount Miner 
 Gwendolen Hill 
 Dunwich Gap
 Dryden Gap
 Wilsons Gap
 Grasstree Gap
 Mount Lionel 
 Boomerang Gap
 Christy Gap
 The Round Mountain

History

Duungidjawu (also known as Kabi Kabi, Cabbee, Carbi, Gabi Gabi) is an Australian Aboriginal language spoken on Duungidjawu country. The Duungidjawu language region includes the landscape within the local government boundaries of Somerset Region and Moreton Bay Region, particularly the towns of Caboolture, Kilcoy, Woodford and Moore.

The town was originally known as Stanley Gate and then as Mooretown. In July 1910 the town took the name of Moore from its railway station, which was named after John and William Moore, graziers of Colinton.

Moore Provisional School opened on 1 December 1904, becoming Moore State School in 1908. The school was mothballed on 31 December 2006 and was officially closed on 23 October 2007. The school was sold for $77,000 in 2012. The school occupied two sites across the road from one another at 29-31 Linville Road and 1 School Street.

Moore Post Office opened by September 1905 (a receiving office had been open from 1903).

On 22 November 1910, the Brisbane Valley railway line opened from Yimbun to Moore. The town was served by Moore railway station. The line closed in 1993. 

In the 2011 census, Moore and the surrounding area had a population of 315 people.

On 1 February 2018, Moore's postcode changed from 4306 to 4314.

Heritage listings
Moore has a number of heritage-listed sites, including:
 Stonehouse: D'Aguilar Highway:

Education
There are no schools in Moore. The nearest primary schools are Linville State School in neighbouring Linville to the north, Benarkin State School in neighbouring Benarkin to the west and Harlin State School in neighbouring Harlin to the south-east. The nearest secondary schools are Toogoolawah State High School (to Year 12) in Toogoolawah to the south, Kilcoy State High School (to Year 12) in Kilcoy to the south-east, Yarraman State School (to Year 10) in Yarraman to the west, and Nanango State High School (to Year 12) in Nanango to the north-west.

References

External links

Towns in Queensland
Suburbs of Somerset Region
Localities in Queensland